Zhang Yiman (born 15 January 1997) is a Chinese badminton player. She won her first World Tour title at the 2019 Vietnam Open. She also won a bronze medal at the 2021 World Championships in the women's singles category.

Career

2021 
In 2021, Zhang participated in the 2021 BWF World Championships in the women's singles category. The unseeded Zhang defeated Hong Kong's Cheung Ngan Yi in the first round before receiving a walkover to the third round, where she defeated the sixteenth seed Kim Ga-eun of South Korea in straight games. Then in the quarter-finals, she shocked the seventh seed and former world champion Ratchanok Intanon in a hard-fought three-game match, 13–21, 21–13, 21–15. This was the biggest win in her career. Although she lost to Japan's Akane Yamaguchi in straight games (19–21, 19–21) in the semi-final, she won a bronze medal, which was her first ever medal from a major tournament.

2022 
Zhang reached the final at the 2022 Hylo Open, but lost to compatriot Han Yue in straight games.

Achievements

BWF World Championships 
Women's singles

BWF World Tour (2 titles, 3 runners-up) 
The BWF World Tour, which was announced on 19 March 2017 and implemented in 2018, is a series of elite badminton tournaments sanctioned by the Badminton World Federation (BWF). The BWF World Tour is divided into levels of World Tour Finals, Super 1000, Super 750, Super 500, Super 300, and the BWF Tour Super 100.

Women's singles

BWF International Challenge/Series (1 runner-up) 
Women's singles

  BWF International Challenge tournament
  BWF International Series tournament

Record against selected opponents 
Record against Year-end Finals finalists, World Championships semi-finalists, and Olympic quarter-finalists. Accurate as of 6 November 2022.

References

External links 
 

1997 births
Living people
Badminton players from Hunan
Chinese female badminton players